Gregory Simmonds (born 16 December 1975) is a retired Jamaican soccer player who played professionally in the USL First Division. He is currently a men's soccer athletic trainer for Virginia Commonwealth University.

Simmonds attended Howard University, playing on the men's soccer team from 1995 to 1998.  He graduated as the all-time leading scorer for the Bison.  In 1999, Simmonds turned professional with the Hershey Wildcats of the USL A-League.  He scored sixteen goals that season and was selected as the A-League Rookie of the Year. His scoring touch led to D.C. United calling him up in January 2000 for two games in the 2000 CONCACAF Champions' Cup.  He came on for Jaime Moreno in a 17 January 2000 victory over L.D. Alajuelense.  Four days later, he started the game with C.F. Pachuca. Simmonds continued his scoring pace for the Wildcats in 2000, adding another sixteen goals to his total.  In February 2001, the Miami Fusion selected Simmonds in the fourth round (thirty-eighth) overall of the 2001 MLS SuperDraft.  He scored four goals for the Fusion, all in Open Cup games, but never scored in league play.  When the Fusion folded following the 2001 season, Simmonds moved to the Rochester Rhinos.  In 2003, Simmonds moved to the Richmond Kickers.  On 19 February 2004, the Charleston Battery of the USL First Division signed Simmonds. He led the team in scoring in both 2004 and 2005. In 2006, he joined the Virginia Beach Mariners and lead the team with nine goals. He finished his career in 2007 with the Puerto Rico Islanders in 2007.  In November 2008, Simmonds joined Richmond United for the Premier Arena Soccer League season.  He scored five goals in three games.

References

External links
 Charleston Battery: Greg Simmonds

1975 births
Living people
Charleston Battery players
D.C. United players
Association football forwards
Hershey Wildcats players
Howard Bison men's soccer players
Expatriate soccer players in the United States
Jamaican footballers
Major League Soccer players
Miami Fusion players
Sportspeople from Kingston, Jamaica
Rochester New York FC players
Richmond Kickers players
USL First Division players
Virginia Beach Mariners players
Puerto Rico Islanders players
A-League (1995–2004) players
Miami Fusion draft picks